Lawrence University Conservatory of Music is a conservatory on the campus of Lawrence University in Appleton, Wisconsin. Founded in 1894, it is the one of the oldest operating conservatories in the United States. Attached to a liberal arts college, the conservatory is exclusively an undergraduate institution.

History
During President Samuel Plantz’s administration, the Conservatory of Music became a separate part of the university with the addition of six faculty members, the introduction of curricular offerings in public school music and music history, and the acquisition of a building devoted exclusively to music instruction.

Organization
Lawrence's Conservatory of music contains three parts: the Music-Drama Center, the Memorial Chapel, and Shattuck Hall of Music. The conservatory has ensembles in band/wind, choir, jazz, orchestra, percussion, theater and dance. Each major ensemble holds two concerts a term in the Memorial Chapel that are webcast. Guest artists are brought in for five concert series, which are all open to the public. Other performing arts series include the Artist Series, Dance Series, Jazz Series, and the World Music Series.

Degrees

Bachelor of Music Program (B.Mus.)
The conservatory offers the bachelor of music degree with majors in music education, music performance, and music theory & composition (music theory and composition are combined into a single major rather than being two separate majors). 

Although the Lawrence Conservatory does not offer a major in jazz, it does offer a BM in Performance or Composition with a Jazz Emphasis. The Lawrence Jazz Department has won over 25 Down Beat awards since 1985.

Students may play the following instruments as their primary applied instruments: piano, organ, harpsichord, voice, violin, viola, violoncello, double bass, guitar, flute, oboe, clarinet, saxophone, bassoon, horn, trumpet, trombone, euphonium, tuba, and percussion.

Music education majors are allotted the options of general, instrumental, choral/general, and instrumental/general emphases. Piano performance majors can also pursue emphases in piano pedagogy or collaborative piano (accompanying).

Bachelor of Musical Arts Program (B.M.A.)
Combining liberal arts and music studies, the B.M.A. degree in jazz and contemporary improvisation empowers students to develop the musical fluency to become successful, versatile, innovative, and adaptable musicians and fully-engaged citizens in today’s ever-changing world.

Bachelor of Arts in Music Program (B.A.)
The college of liberal arts also offers a Bachelor of Arts with a major in music. Candidates for that major take many of their classes at the conservatory, although their degrees are not earned from that division of the university.

Bachelor of Music Program and Bachelor of Arts in the College (B.Mus. & B.A.)
The conservatory and college of liberal arts also combine for a five-year double degree program, in which students ultimately receive a BA and a BM. The majority of conservatory students are in the double degree program.

Alumni
Julia Gaines, percussionist

References 

Lawrence University
Educational institutions established in 1894
1894 establishments in Wisconsin